Fann Woon Fong (Pha̍k-fa-sṳ: Fam Vùn-fông; born 27 January 1971), better known by her stage name Fann Wong, is a Singaporean actress, singer and model. She is referred to as MediaCorp's "Ah Jie" (top actress) together with Zoe Tay for being one of the top actresses in Singapore's Chinese-language entertainment industry.

At Singapore's Star Awards 1995, Fann became the first actress to snag three prominent awards in the same year: Best Actress, Best Newcomer and Top 5 Most Popular Female Artiste. After gaining regional exposure and popularity in Asia through film and television productions, she became the first Singaporean actress to break into Hollywood, playing Chon Lin in the 2003 film Shanghai Knights. She was also the youngest actress to have earned an All-Time Favourite Artiste at the Star Awards after winning the Top 10 Most Popular Female Artistes award from 1995 to 2004 respectively with Xie Shaoguang. She married actor Christopher Lee on 29 September 2009.

Early life and career

Early days: television career
Born in Singapore to Hakka tailor parents, Fann had three siblings—an older sister, as well as a younger brother and a younger sister named Fan Wen Qing (former child actress). She was educated at Temasek Secondary School, where she took her GCE 'O' Level examinations in 1987.

Fann was a child actor while in primary school and featured in several SBC children's programmes. At the age of 16, she won a beauty contest organised by Her World, a Singapore fashion magazine. She started a successful modelling career in Singapore, and spent the next two years modelling part-time while taking her GCE 'A' Level examinations at a private school. She afterward earned a diploma in fashion merchandising from LaSalle International Fashion School in Singapore.

Fann moved to Taiwan in 1993. One of her earliest successes was in an Oil of Ulan (now Oil of Olay) commercial aired in Taiwan and Singapore. The following year, a Singaporean television producer discovered her and cast her in Dreams Come True, a Singapore drama series. Fann soon starred in two more Singapore television series, The Challenger and Chronicle of Life.

After a year in the Singapore television industry, her role in Chronicle of Life won her Best Actress and Best Newcomer awards at Singapore's 1995 Star Awards. In 1996, her role in The Unbroken Cycle won her first regional nomination at the Asian Television Awards. She continued to star in a large array of drama serials, including A Romance in Shanghai (produced in Shanghai), Wild Orchids (filmed in Sydney) and Brave New World (filmed in Amsterdam and Belgium).

In late 1996, Fann released in Singapore her first Mandarin pop album Fanntasy, which contained a duet (theme song of her TV drama 'Brave New World') with Taiwanese singer Jeff Chang. The album was retitled I Live Alone and repackaged with two additional songs for the Taiwanese market and won 4 IFPI platinum sales awards in Taiwan, marking the start of Fann's regional success.

Late 1990s: rise of regional popularity

In 1996, Fann starred in the 40-episode blockbuster drama Brave New World alongside Christopher Lee and Hong Kong actor Alex Man. This was the first time ever that Fann would act together with Christopher Lee. Fann also performed the theme song, "Don't let love become hard for us", as a duet with Taiwanese singer Jeff Chang.

In 1998, Fann was named the female lead, Xiaolongnü, in TCS remake of the hit wuxia drama The Return of the Condor Heroes where she once again starred alongside Christopher Lee. The release of this drama, along with her second album, Shopping, further increased her exposure in Taiwan and China. When Hong Kong director Derek Yee saw Fann's "Shopping" music video on Hong Kong's Channel V, he flew to Singapore to cast her as the lead actress in the Hong Kong art film The Truth About Jane and Sam. The movie topped the Singapore box office for three weeks and her role as a gritty wild-child won her a Best New Performer nomination at the 19th Hong Kong Film Awards in 2000. In addition, her role as a self-centred stockbroker in Out to Win attracted a million viewers in Singapore during its finale. It was during this period when Fann acquired many of her die-hard fans, led by the Fann-atic Fan Club (FFC).

In 1999, Fann released her third album, Missing You, recorded "Private Number" with British boyband 911 and performed Moments of Magic, Singapore's official millennium song. These musical successes resulted in her being the first Singapore artiste to stage a solo paying concert ("My Story"—Fann Wong in Concert) at the Singapore Indoor Stadium in 2000. That same year, she released her fourth Mandarin album, No Problem.

During the next few years, Fann focused on her acting career. She played a two-timing television reporter in the omnibus Hong Kong film When I Fall in Love... With Both, acted as a lovelorn insurance agent in the Singaporean romantic drama Looking For Stars, as well as played the title character in the Taiwanese period drama Madam White Snake. She also began hosting travelogue shows, including Travel Hunt: Japan and Fann Adventure, which was filmed in South Africa and Malaysia.

2003: Hollywood
In 2002, Fann became the first Singaporean actress to play a major role in a Hollywood production, as Chon Lin in Shanghai Knights. When the film was released in early 2003, Stephen Hunter of The Washington Post stated:

Fann is an enchanting new film presence. Clearly modelled after Zhang Ziyi of Crouching Tiger, Hidden Dragon, she combines a dancer's grace with a fighter's speed, and looks great standing still or whirling.

The Hollywood Reporter'''s David Hunter noted that Fann was "more than equal to playing the strong woman fighter who's also pretty darn cute", while John Keenan of the Omaha World-Herald stated that "Fann's stunt work is actually more memorable than Jackie Chan's here". In Hong Kong, the South China Morning Post stated that she "seems set to displace Lucy Liu as Hollywood's Asian babe du jour". She was subsequently nominated under the Best Fight category in MTV Movie Awards 2003, and in 2004, won the Singapore Street Festival's Best International Artiste Award.

2004–2007
In 2004, Fann continued acting in China period dramas such as Moon Fairy and My Fair Lady. She also starred in a Singapore serial on the SARS epidemic titled Always on My Mind, which won her a Best Actress nomination at the 2004 Star Awards. In mid-2004, Fann was cast in the lead role in the German-Singapore telemovie, House of Harmony. In late 2004, Fann released her first publication, a semi-autobiographical comic book Girl Illustrated. After a musical hiatus of five years, she released her first compilation, In Love With You.

In April 2005, Fann was invited to the Cannes MIPTV Media Market where she promoted House of Harmony and discussed possible collaborations with European industry professionals. She obtained the All-Time Favourite Artiste for obtaining the Top 10 Most Popular Female Artistes .
 House of Harmony has since been telecast in Germany, Austria, France and Belgium to a combined prime-time viewership of over 80 million. That same year, Fann took on a lead role in a Taiwanese art-house romance film, Dragon Eye Congee, which was nominated for five categories at the inaugural Asian Festival of First Films.

In August 2005, she made her voiceover debut in Singapore's first 3D animation film, Zodiac, The Race Begins, which was released in early 2006. Furthermore, she also contributed her songs for the soundtracks of the movie.

In November 2006, Fann made her first promotional visit to Phnom Penh, Cambodia. She performed at the Tonle Sap Water Festival Mega Concert and visited the Krousar Thmey blind school, where she donated cassette recorders and biscuits.

2007–2012: Focus on China market (under Huayi Brothers)
In early 2007, Fann signed a management contract with China's Huayi Brothers. Fann also became the first Singaporean artist to release a self-illustrated 3D animation, titled Fanntasy World. The release of her Singapore film Just Follow Law, in which she had to play an uncouth and scruffy man in a woman's body, was a major attraction at the Chinese New Year box office and won her critical acclaim in the Singapore and Malaysian media.

In 2008, she was invited to be a judge at the sixth "spirit of fire" international film festival which was held in Russia. Ah Long Pte Ltd reached No. 1 in both Singapore's and Malaysia's box office during the Chinese new year. Later, the film Dance of Dragon that she paired with Korean hunk Jang Hyuk led her to win her first International Best Actress at West Hollywood International Film Festival.

In 2009, Fann starred with future husband Christopher Lee in The Wedding Game. The movie won the best feature film at the first international comedy film festival held in Thailand. In June, she finished her new Chinese movie In a tangle . In September, she filmed the romantic movie Cornflower blue, starring with Alex Fong and Chang Chen in Hainan. Both of them were on the screen in late 2010. She filmed another comedy film Happy Go Lucky, which was shown during the Chinese New Year.

In 2010, she slowed down her pace and only two dramas were filmed. But she gained her critic praises from many Chinese media for her character "Ren DaiDai" in the drama Jin DaBan De Zuihou Yiye starring with Chinese actress Fan Bingbing. Two more Singaporean dramas followed in 2011.

But 2012 seemed to be a busy year for Fann. At the begin of the year, she played a syren in the series The Legend of Master Ji 3, then she was invited to be a judge for TBS's fashion competition show Asian Ace. Later she flew to ShanDong and played a spicy wife in the movie Ai Shui Shui together with Jaycee Chan, and also a telemovie Han di hu lue zhu gui based on novel Water Margin. Another movie Runaway Woman was filmed in Xinjiang in May. She was awarded the "2012 Huading Most Popular Asian Actress Award" in Beijing Olympic Sports Centre on 4 July. Though she didn't release new album for years, she was still invited to perform at 9th Asia Song Festival which was held in Yeosul, Korea, on 4 August. In October, she flew to Xinjiang again to film the period drama Tun Shu Xi Jiang about revolution occurring in Xinjiang. She worked with Hong Kong actor Bowie Lam (her husband in the drama) and Chinese director Zhang Jizhong.

2013–present: New Beginning (under Catwalk)
2013 became a new beginning for Fann. She set up her own studio at the end of 2012, ended her contract with Huayi Brothers, and signed a new contract with Taiwan management agency Catwalk.

In 2014, after working with Fann on a children's charity in Thailand, illustrator Patrick Yee designed and illustrated a nearly wordless picturebook, published by Epigram Books, about the adventures of a girl with the same name.

Personal life
Fann has been romantically involved with Malaysian actor Christopher Lee since late 2002. They went public with their relationship in mid-2005. She had only one prior romance known to the public: an 11-year relationship with businessman Anthony Chan.

Fann and Lee have collaborated eight times in television productions and have played lovers in six of these. After publicly acknowledging their relationship in mid-2005, they were seldom seen together. However, in December 2006, they walked together hand-in-hand down the blue carpet of the 2006 Star Awards ceremony. The gesture was noted by the Singapore media as a rare public acknowledgement of their relationship.  	
			
In September 2008, it was rumoured she would be marrying Lee. They were married on 16 May 2009. On 9 August 2014, Fann gave birth to a son named Zed.

In July 2020, Fann alerted her fans to a scammer using her identity to get her fans' personal information. The scam asked fans to register their names on a website in order to receive a giveaway prize.

On 5 July 2021, Fann's dad passed on at the age of 81.

On 13 October 2021, Fann opened her online pastry shop called Fanntasy.

Fann's hobbies include illustrating comics, shopping, and eating.

Filmography

Accolades

References

External links

1971 births
Living people
Singaporean Buddhists
Singaporean female models
20th-century Singaporean women singers
Singaporean film actresses
Singaporean Mandopop singers
Singaporean people of Hakka descent
People from Huizhou
Singaporean television actresses
Singaporean voice actresses
20th-century Singaporean actresses
21st-century Singaporean actresses
Hakka musicians
21st-century Singaporean women singers